Warren Albert Stevens (November 2, 1919 – March 27, 2012) was an American stage, screen, and television actor.

Early life and career
Born in Clarks Summit, Pennsylvania, Stevens entered the United States Naval Academy in 1937 but was medically discharged in 1940. During World War II he served in the United States Army Air Forces as a pilot.

A founding member of the Actors Studio in New York, Stevens received notice on Broadway in the late 1940s, and thereafter was offered a Hollywood contract at 20th Century Fox. His first Broadway role was in The Life of Galileo (1947) and his first movie role followed in The Frogmen (1951). As a young studio contract player, Stevens had little choice of material, and he appeared in films that included Phone Call from a Stranger (1952), Wait Till the Sun Shines, Nellie (1952), and Gorilla at Large (1954). A memorable movie role was that of the ill-fated "Doc" Ostrow in the science fiction film Forbidden Planet (1956).  He also had supporting roles in The Barefoot Contessa (1954) with Humphrey Bogart and Intent to Kill (1958).

Despite occasional parts in big films, Stevens was unable to break out consistently into A-list movies, so he carved out a career in television as a journeyman dramatic actor.

Stevens was a Democrat who supported the campaign of Adlai Stevenson during the 1952 presidential election.

Television career
He co-starred as Lt. William Storm in Tales of the 77th Bengal Lancers (NBC, 1956–1957), a prime time adventure series set in India. Stevens also provided the voice of John Bracken in season one of Bracken's World (NBC, 1968–1970).  He played the role of Elliot Carson in the daytime series Return to Peyton Place during its two-year run (1972-1974).

He appeared in over 150 prime time shows from the 1950s to the early 1980s, including:

 Golden Age anthology series (Actors Studio, Campbell Playhouse, The Web, Justice, Philco Television Playhouse, Studio One, The United States Steel Hour, Bob Hope Presents the Chrysler Theatre, Route 66),
 Mysteries Hawaiian Eye (4 episodes), Perry Mason, The Untouchables, Climax!, Checkmate (2 episodes), Surfside 6 (2 episodes), 77 Sunset Strip (2 episodes), Behind Closed Doors, I Spy, The Man from U.N.C.L.E., Ironside (3 episodes), The Mod Squad, Mannix, Cannon (3 episodes), Griff, Mission: Impossible (4 episodes), Combat! (1 episode).
 Horror and Sci Fi Inner Sanctum (3 episodes), Alfred Hitchcock Presents (2 episodes), The Twilight Zone (episode "Dead Man's Shoes"), One Step Beyond (episode "The Riddle"), The Outer Limits (episode "Keeper of the Purple Twilight"), Star Trek (episode "By Any Other Name"), Voyage to the Bottom of the Sea (3 episodes), The Time Tunnel, Science Fiction Theater, Land of the Giants (2 episodes)
 Comedies The Donna Reed Show (2 episodes, 1965 and 1966), M*A*S*H (1 episode, Season 4, episode 13, "The Gun", Dec 2, 1975)
 Westerns (Laramie, The Rebel, The Man Called Shenandoah), Wagon Train (2 episodes), The Alaskans, Tales of Wells Fargo (1 episode), Gunsmoke (3 episodes), Bonanza (4 episodes), Daniel Boone (3 episodes), The Virginian (3 episodes),  The Big Valley (one episode), Rawhide, and Have Gun, Will Travel (3 episodes). Tombstone Territory (1 episode), Stoney Burke (1 episode).  In 1970 he appeared as Paul Carson on The Men From Shiloh (rebranded name for The Virginian) in the episode titled "Hannah."

Stevens' appearance in the 1955 movie Robbers' Roost introduced him to Richard Boone, who hired him for a continuing television role on The Richard Boone Show, an award-winning NBC anthology series which lasted for the 1963–1964 season.

Stevens was a close friend of actor Richard Basehart and helped him through a difficult divorce in the early 1960s. Stevens guest-starred in a few episodes of Basehart's ABC series, Voyage to the Bottom of the Sea. He also had a supporting role on another Irwin Allen production, The Return of Captain Nemo in 1978.

In his later years, Stevens' appearances were infrequent. He guest-starred in ER in March 2006 and had two roles in 2007.

For the DVD release of Combat!'' he provided audio commentary for "The Gun" (S5, E1) an episode in which he had guest-starred (he also guest-starred in "The Imposter" (S3, E10))

Death
Stevens died on March 27, 2012, from complications of lung disease in his home in Sherman Oaks, Los Angeles, California. He had three children.

Filmography

References

External links
 
 

1919 births
2012 deaths
American male film actors
American male stage actors
American male television actors
People from Clarks Summit, Pennsylvania
20th-century American male actors
20th Century Studios contract players
United States Army personnel of World War II
United States Army personnel
People from Greater Los Angeles
21st-century American male actors
Male actors from Pennsylvania
Deaths from lung disease
California Democrats
Pennsylvania Democrats
Male Western (genre) film actors
United States Navy midshipmen